Bethel Air Base is a former United States Army airfield located three nautical miles (6 km) southwest of the central business district of Bethel, a city in the Bethel Census Area of the U.S. state of Alaska.

History
Construction began September 21, 1941, and the airfield was activated July 4, 1942. It was used by Air Transport Command as auxiliary airfield for Lend-Lease aircraft being flown to Siberia. The facility was transferred to Eleventh Air Force, then to Alaskan Air Command in 1945; it became the joint-use Bethel Airport. It was used for construction of AC&W Bethel Air Force Station in the mid-1950s. Full jurisdiction was turned over to the Alaskan government in 1958.

See also 

 Alaska World War II Army Airfields
 Air Transport Command
 Northwest Staging Route

References

Airfields of the United States Army Air Forces Air Transport Command in Alaska
Airfields of the United States Army Air Forces in Alaska
Closed installations of the United States Army